Castle Donovan or Castledonovan or O'Donovan's Castle refer to the remains of an Irish tower house or túrtheach, in a valley near Drimoleague, of medium size which was the so-called "seat" of the Clann Cathail sept of the O'Donovans for a period during the 16th century. The original name of the castle, and when the O'Donovans were actually living in it, was Sowagh (or Sooagh, Suagh) before the 17th century. The name of Castle Donovan, after the Manor of the Castle of O'Donovan, is associated with a regrant from James II of England in 1615. Approximately 60 feet in height, it sits on a large rock or outcropping, which forms the ground floor, close to the bank of the River Ilen. It is commonly believed to have been built, or at the very least augmented, by Donal of the Hides, Lord of Clancahill from about 1560 to his death 1584. His son Donal II O'Donovan then repaired or further altered the structure some decades later, but was not living in it by then. It is believed that his father had already relocated the family in the first decade of that century to the more profitable Rahine Manor on the seacoast to protect their maritime interests.

According to tradition the tower was severely damaged by Oliver Cromwell's soldiers in the late 1640s, blown up with powder in retaliation for Donal III O'Donovan joining the Stuart side and for his involvement in the rebellion and massacres of 1641, and has been uninhabited since that time.

In 1834, Philip Dixon Hardy published an account of his 1828 journey to the "vale of Castle Donovan", including a drawing in which several of the outbuildings can still be seen, in the Dublin Penny Journal. He says:

The tower's surrounding wall or bawn and outbuildings are now gone, but over two thirds of the tower still remain. The 17th century explosion left only a small gouge in the southwest corner, but caused huge cracks in the masonry, leaving the structure unsafe, and over two centuries later the entire western wall, excluding the still intact spiral staircase, and majority of the southern wall collapsed. It underwent conservation by the Office of Public Works between 2001 and 2014 and is a listed National Monument.

See also
 Barony of Carbery

Notes

References

 Adams, Constance Louisa, with Lucius O'Brien (illus.), Castles of Ireland: Some Fortress Histories and Legends. London: Elliot Stock. 1904.
 Butler, W.F.T., "The Barony of Carbery", in Journal of the Cork Historical and Archaeological Society Volume X, Second Series. 1904. pp. 1–10, 73–84.
 Carroll, Michael J. and Alan Langford (illus.), The Castles and Fortified Houses of West Cork. Bantry Design Studios. 2001.
 Donovan, Daniel, Sketches in Carbery, County Cork. Its Antiquities, History, Legends, and Topography. Dublin: McGlashan & Gill. 1876.
 FitzPatrick, Elizabeth, Royal Inauguration in Gaelic Ireland c. 1100-1600: A Cultural Landscape Study. Boydell Press. 2004.
 Hardy, Philip Dixon, "Castle Donovan", in The Dublin Penny Journal, Vol. III, No. 122, November 1, 1834. pp. 137–9. Available here at Googlebooks
 Legrand, Caroline, "Du tourisme généalogique dans l'Irlande contemporaine" Revue de Synthèse. Volume 123, Number 1. December, 2002. pp. 131–47.
 Legrand, Caroline, La quête de parenté. Pratiques et enjeux de la généalogie en Irlande. Québec: Presses Université Laval. 2006.
 O'Donovan, John (ed. and tr.), Annala Rioghachta Eireann. Annals of the Kingdom of Ireland by the Four Masters, from the Earliest Period to the Year 1616. 7 vols. Dublin: Royal Irish Academy. 1848-51. 2nd edition, 1856. Volume VI, Pedigree of O'Donovan, pp. 2430–83
 Ó Murchadha, Diarmuid, Family Names of County Cork. Cork: The Collins Press. 2nd edition, 1996.

Castles in County Cork
Ruins in the Republic of Ireland
O'Donovan family
National Monuments in County Cork